Mac Powell (born Johnny Mac Powell; December 25, 1972), originally from  Clanton, Alabama, is an American singer, songwriter, producer, and musician who formed the Christian rock band Third Day with guitarist Mark Lee, with both of them being the only continuous members of the band prior to their disbandment in 2018. Powell also delves into country music, having released several independent country albums. As of 2021, he continues his career in Christian music as a solo artist.

Powell won Male Vocalist of the Year at the Gospel Music Association's 2002 Dove Awards.

Background
After his family moved from Alabama to Georgia, Powell attended McEachern High School in Powder Springs, Georgia, where he met Lee and became involved in a band known as "Nuclear Hoedown". This experience resulted in further collaboration when he began writing songs about his faith, formed a Christian band called Third Day, and eventually landed a record deal with Gray Dot Records.  Powell lives in Atlanta, Georgia, with his wife, Aimee and five children: Scout, Cash, Camie Love, Emmanuel, and Birdie Clare.

Independent projects
Powell has collaborated with other artists on numerous occasions, most notably in the City on a Hill series, and more recently in the Glory Revealed series.  Credits include:

 2000, "Seize the Day" and "I Can Hear You" on Carolyn Arends' Seize the Day and Other Stories
 2000, "God of Wonders" (with Cliff & Danielle Young of Caedmon's Call) and "I Remember You" (with Gene Eugene) on City on a Hill: Songs of Worship and Praise
 2000, "Sheltering Tree" Additional personnel/vocals on NewSong's Sheltering Tree
 2002, "Sing Alleluia" (with Jennifer Knapp) "Our Great God" (with Fernando Ortega) on City on a Hill: Sing Alleluia
 2002, "Mountain of God" on Max Lucado's album Traveling Light: Songs From the 23rd Psalm
 2002, "It's Christmas Time" (with Derri Daugherty, Out of Eden, Sara Groves, Dan Haseltine, Leigh Nash, Michael Tait, Cliff & Danielle Young of Caedmon's Call, Terry Scott Taylor and Christine Byrd) on City on a Hill: It's Christmas Time
 2003, "Friends 2003" a special tribute to and featuring Michael W. Smith
 2003, "Love Lifted Me" (with Randy Travis) on Worship and Faith
 2004, "We Keep To Our Throne From Weeping" (with Jeff Deyo) on Light
 2004, "I See Love" (with Steven Curtis Chapman and Bart Millard) on The Passion of the Christ: Songs
 2004, "Believe Me Now" (Backing vocalist with Jason Wade of the band Lifehouse) on Steven Curtis Chapman's All Things New
 2007, "By His Wounds" (with Steven Curtis Chapman, Brian Littrell & Mark Hall) on Glory Revealed
 2008, "Fly Away" with GRITS on Reiterate
 2008, "Over the Next Hill" (with Brooks & Dunn) on Billy: The Early Years (soundtrack)
 2010, "Carry Me" from Jenny & Tyler's Faint Not
 2012, Mac Powell Country album - August 1, 2012 (500 copy limited pre-release) and August 21, 2012 general release date 
 2014, Southpaw Country album - October 14, 2014
 2015, "Make Me a Believer" from Andy Mineo's "Uncomfortable" album
 2015, "I Can't Save Myself" from Morgan Harper Nichols' Morgan Harper Nichols album
 2018, Mac Powell and the Family Reunion - (May 30 to June 27, 2018 limited sale)

Producer

 2004, Co-producer on Fusebox's Once Again album
 2009, Co-producer on Revive's Chorus of the Saints album

Discography

Albums

Notes

Singles as lead artist

Singles as featured artist

Compilation contributions

References

External links

People from Clanton, Alabama
American performers of Christian music
1972 births
Living people
21st-century American singers
21st-century American male singers